Carry On Jatta 3 is an upcoming Indian Punjabi-language comedy film directed by Smeep Kang and produced by Humble Motion Pictures. It is a sequel to the Carry On Jatta 2 (2018). The film stars Gippy Grewal and Sonam Bajwa in lead roles with Gurpreet Ghuggi, Binnu Dhillon, Nasir Chinyoti, Jaswinder Bhalla, B.N. Sharma, Karamjit Anmol and Upasana Singh and Jyotii Sethi in supporting roles. Carry On Jatta 3 is scheduled to be theatrically released on 29 June 2023.

Cast 

 Gippy Grewal
 Sonam Bajwa
 Binnu Dhillon
 Jaswinder Bhalla
 Gurpreet Ghuggi
 B.N. Sharma
 Karamjit Anmol
 Nasir Chinyoti
 Kavita Kaushik
 Upasana Singh

Production 
The film is  Gippy Grewal's home production. The entire shoot of the film took place in Great Yarmouth, Norfolk, UK.

References

External links 

 

2023 films
Indian slapstick comedy films
Punjabi-language Indian films
2020s Punjabi-language films
Indian sequel films
2023 comedy films